The Roman Catholic Diocese of Amboina is a diocese located in the city of Amboina in the Ecclesiastical province of Makassar in Indonesia.

History
 December 22, 1902: Established as the Apostolic Prefecture of Dutch New Guinea from the Apostolic Vicariate of Batavia
 August 29, 1920: Promoted as the Apostolic Vicariate of Dutch New Guinea
 May 12, 1949: Renamed as Apostolic Vicariate of Amboina
 January 3, 1961: Promoted as Diocese of Amboina

Leadership
 Bishops of Amboina (Roman rite)
 Bishop Seno Ngutra (8 December 2021 – present)
 Bishop Petrus Canisius Mandagi, M.S.C. (10 June 1994 – 11 November 2020)
 Bishop Andreas Peter Cornelius Sol, M.S.C. (15 January 1965 – 10 June 1994)
 Bishop Jacques Grent, M.S.C. (3 January 1961 – 15 January 1965)
 Vicars Apostolic of Amboina (Roman Rite)
 Bishop Jacques Grent, M.S.C. (12 May 1949 – 3 January 1961)
 Vicars Apostolic of Dutch New Guinea (Roman Rite)
 Bishop Jacques Grent, M.S.C. (10 July 1947 – 12 May 1949)
 Bishop Giovanni Aerts, M.S.C. (28 August 1920 – 1942. Death execution)
 Prefects Apostolic of Dutch New Guinea (Roman Rite)
 Fr. Hendrik Nollen, M.S.C. (1915 – 1920)
 Fr. Matthijs Neyens, M.S.C. (1902 – 1915. Dismissed)

Citation

Bibliography

External links

 GCatholic.org
 Catholic Hierarchy

Roman Catholic dioceses in Indonesia
Christian organizations established in 1902
Roman Catholic dioceses and prelatures established in the 20th century